Entreviñas is one of six parishes (administrative divisions)  in Avilés, a municipality within the province and autonomous community of Asturias, in northern Spain. 

Villages

Parishes in Avilés